The 1968 Boston Patriots season was the franchise's 9th season in the American Football League. The Patriots ended the season with a record of four wins and ten losses, and finished fourth in the AFL's Eastern Division.  The Patriots played their final season of home games at Fenway Park before moving to Alumni Stadium on the campus of Boston College for the following season.

Offseason

NFL Draft

Staff

Roster

Regular season

Standings

Game-by-game results

Game summaries

Week 1

References

Boston Patriots
New England Patriots seasons
Boston Patriots
1960s in Boston